Hameeda Hossain (née Akhund; born 1936) is a Bangladeshi human rights activist and academic. She has published many books and articles relating to human rights and women's issues in Bangladesh, in Islam, and worldwide.  She is a founding member of Ain o Salish Kendra, a legal aid and human rights organization.

In 1969, in the then East Pakistan,  along with economist Rehman Sobhan she founded English-language monthly current affairs magazine, Forum. The magazine became renowned for its outspoken criticism against the West Pakistani establishment, and advocacy of democracy and economic reforms in the Pakistani union.

Hossain is a member of the board of directors of the Centre for Secular Space, an international human rights organization  that stands for International Defense Against Religious Extremism.

Early life and education 

Hameeda was born in Hyderabad, Sindh (now in Pakistan) in 1936, the youngest of three girls and three boys. The children lived with their mother in Karachi while their father, a judge, was posted to various cities. She attended a convent school in Karachi. She graduated from Wellesley College in the US and earned a PhD from Oxford University.

Marriage and family 

Hossain is married to Kamal Hossain, who has been the president of the Gano Forum political party in Bangladesh since he founded it in 1992. They have two daughters, including Dina Hossain, a film maker, and Sara Hossain, a lawyer and writer who is the co-editor of Honor: Crimes, Paradigms and Violence Against Women.

References

1936 births
Living people
Feminist writers
Bangladeshi feminists
Proponents of Islamic feminism
Bangladeshi women's rights activists
Wellesley College alumni
Alumni of the University of Oxford
20th-century Bangladeshi lawyers
21st-century Bangladeshi lawyers
Date of birth missing (living people)
Bangladeshi women lawyers
Bangladeshi people of Pakistani descent